The Minolta XE-5 was a 35 mm single-lens reflex camera from Minolta of Japan, introduced in .
It was a simplified and lower-cost version of Minolta's XE/XE-1/XE-7, keeping that camera's automatic exposure but removing viewfinder displays, multiple-exposure capability, the built-in eyepiece shutter (replaced by a viewfinder cap on the shoulder strap), the film tab holder and the film advance window.  The model was produced until 1977, when it was replaced by the Minolta XG-7.

References

135 film cameras
XE-5
Products introduced in 1975